Francisco I. Madero is a city in the northern Mexican state of Coahuila. It serves as the municipal seat for the Francisco I. Madero Municipality, Coahuila.

It is named for Revolutionary hero Francisco I. Madero, a native of nearby Parras de la Fuente.

It had a 2005 census population of 30,084, while its surrounding municipality had a total population of 51,528.

References
Link to tables of population data from Census of 2005 INEGI: Instituto Nacional de Estadística, Geografía e Informática
Coahuila Enciclopedia de los Municipios de México

External links
Municipio Francisco I. Madero Official website

Populated places in Coahuila
Populated places established in 1895
1895 establishments in Mexico